These are the number-one hits on the Top 100 Singles chart in 1980 as published by Cash Box magazine.

See also
1980 in music
List of Hot 100 number-one singles of 1980 (U.S.)

References
http://members.aol.com/_ht_a/randypny4/cashbox/1980.html
http://www.cashboxmagazine.com/archives/80s_files/1980.html
https://web.archive.org/web/20060614052109/http://musicseek.info/no1hits/1980.htm

1980
1980 record charts
1980 in American music